The Seacoast Region is the southeast area of the U.S. state of New Hampshire that includes the eastern portion of Rockingham County and the southern portion of Strafford County. The region stretches  along the Atlantic Ocean from New Hampshire's border with Salisbury, Massachusetts, to the Piscataqua River and New Hampshire's border with Kittery, Maine. The shoreline alternates between rocky and rough headlands and areas with sandy beaches. Some of the beaches are bordered by jetties or groins, particularly in the towns of Rye and Hampton. The Seacoast Region includes some inland towns as well, as far west as Epping and as far north as Rochester.

The city of Portsmouth is the cultural and commercial hub of the region, with numerous historical landmarks and tourist attractions including Strawbery Banke, the Moffatt-Ladd House, and the John Paul Jones House. Dover in Strafford County is the largest city in the region by population and is the oldest permanent settlement in New Hampshire. Dover is home to the Children's Museum of New Hampshire and the renowned Woodman Institute Museum. The Seacoast Region was the first area of the state to be permanently settled by Europeans in the early 17th century.

Straddling the maritime border New Hampshire shares with Maine are the Isles of Shoals - White, Seavey, Lunging, and Star Islands. From Portsmouth, they are a short ferry ride out into the Gulf of Maine.

Towns and cities in the region

Coastal towns and cities (south to north)
 Seabrook
 Hampton
 North Hampton
 Rye
 New Castle 
 Portsmouth

Other towns and cities

 Atkinson
 Brentwood
 Danville
 Dover
 Durham
 East Kingston
 Epping
 Exeter
 Fremont
 Greenland
 Hampstead
 Hampton Falls
 Kensington
 Kingston
 Lee
 Madbury
 Newfields
 Newington
 Newmarket
 Newton
 Plaistow
 Rochester
 Rollinsford
 Sandown
 Somersworth
 South Hampton
 Stratham

Tourist attractions in the region
 The Children's Museum of New Hampshire in Dover
 Great Bay estuary, with several access sites
 Hampton Beach
 The Music Hall in Portsmouth; the state's oldest theater 
 Odiorne Point State Park and the associated Seacoast Science Center
 Prescott Park, waterfront park with flower gardens, water fountains and summer plays and concerts
 Star Island, seasonal conference center and hotel located  out to sea
 The Strawbery Banke outdoor history museum of Portsmouth
 The USS Albacore, a museum ship in Portsmouth
 Water Country, New England's largest water park
 The Wentworth by the Sea, a grand old hotel previously fallen into disrepair but now completely renovated
 The Whittemore Center, a multi-purpose arena in Durham, and home to University of New Hampshire ice hockey teams, as well as various concerts and events
 The Woodman Institute Museum in Dover
 Auto racing
 Lee USA Speedway in Lee
 New England Dragway in Epping
 Star Speedway in Epping

Transportation
New Hampshire Route 1A runs along the ocean shore, while U.S. Route 1 runs in a parallel direction slightly farther inland. During the high tourist season, these highways are crowded with day tourists and seasonal renters. Slightly farther inland, Interstate 95 (the Blue Star Turnpike) carries most of the through traffic between Maine and Massachusetts, while NH Route 101 carries New Hampshire's east–west traffic between the Seacoast Region and the inland portions of the state. The Spaulding Turnpike (NH 16) originates in Portsmouth and travels north through Dover and Rochester, connecting the Seacoast with New Hampshire's Lakes Region and White Mountains Region.

Amtrak's Downeaster stops in three Seacoast communities - Dover, Durham–UNH, and Exeter- with service to Boston's North Station and Portland, and points north. The Downeaster also stops in nearby Wells, Maine.

The Pease International Tradeport includes a shipping port (the Port of New Hampshire) and the Portsmouth International Airport at Pease, which provides cargo and passenger service.

References

External links

Seacoast region at NH Division of Travel and Tourism Development

Regions of New Hampshire
Tourism regions of New Hampshire